A list of animated feature films that were released in 2015.

Highest-grossing animated films of 2015
The top ten animated films by worldwide gross in 2015 are as follows:

Minions became the first non-Disney animated film and the third animated film after Toy Story 3 (2010) and Frozen (2013) to gross over $1 billion, and is currently the fourth highest-grossing animated film of all time, the 20th highest-grossing film of all time and the highest-grossing film produced by Illumination. Inside Out is currently the 17th highest-grossing animated film of all time. Monkey King: Hero Is Back is currently the third highest-grossing fully Chinese animated film off all time.

References

2015
2015-related lists